Dwight Smith may refer to:
Dwight Smith (American football) (born 1978), American football player
Dwight Smith (baseball) (1963-2022), former Major League baseball player
Dwight Smith Jr. (born 1992), baseball player
Dwight Morrell Smith (born 1931), chemistry professor and academic administrator